Lemon Bluff is an unincorporated community  located in south Volusia County, Florida, United States. It is located along the St. Johns River southeast of Osteen, Florida near the Lake Monroe Conservation Area.

References

Unincorporated communities in Volusia County, Florida
Unincorporated communities in Florida
Populated places on the St. Johns River